Odd Strengenes is a Norwegian sport shooter who has won the IPSC Norwegian Handgun Championship twice (2012, 2016), the IPSC Norwegian Rifle Championship three times (1997, 1998, 2006) and the IPSC Norwegian Tournament Championship once (2014).

References 

IPSC shooters
Norwegian male sport shooters
Living people
Year of birth missing (living people)